Corydoras griseus, the gray corydoras, is a small catfish of the corydoras genus. Its natural range is in the Brazilian Amazon region in small tributary streams.

Aquarium care
It needs regular live-food feedings, though it will pick up and eat dried food off the bottom.

References

Exotic Tropical Fishes; by H. Axelrod, C. Emmens, W. Burgess, N. Pronek
fishwise.co.za
 

Corydoras
Fish described in 1940